Abancay District is one of the nine districts of the Abancay Province in Peru.

Geography 
Some of the highest mountains of the district are listed below:

See also 
 Ampay National Sanctuary

References

Districts of the Abancay Province
Districts of the Apurímac Region